Ned Colfer (born 1941 in New Ross, County Wexford) is an Irish retired sportsperson.  He played hurling with his local club Geraldine O'Hanrahan's and was a member of the Wexford senior inter-county team in the 1960s and 1970s.

References

1941 births
Living people
Geraldine O'Hanrahan's hurlers
Wexford inter-county hurlers
Leinster inter-provincial hurlers
All-Ireland Senior Hurling Championship winners